The Albany, Florida and Northern Railway (AF&N) was chartered in 1889 and built a railway between Albany and Cordele, Georgia, beginning operation in 1891.  The following year the line was leased to the Savannah, Americus and Montgomery Railway (SA&M), who was responsible for obtaining the charter to begin with.  

When the SA&M entered receivership in 1892 and was sold under foreclosure in 1895, the AF&N was spun off as a separate independent company, the Albany and Northern Railway.

References

External links
 HawkinsRails.net Albany & Northern page

Defunct Georgia (U.S. state) railroads
Railway companies established in 1889
Railway companies disestablished in 1895
Predecessors of the Southern Railway (U.S.)
1889 establishments in Georgia (U.S. state)
1895 disestablishments in Georgia (U.S. state)
American companies disestablished in 1895
American companies established in 1889